The 2018 Boston Cannons season was the eighteenth season for the Boston Cannons of Major League Lacrosse. The Cannons entered the season looking to improve upon their franchise-worst and last place 3-11 record in 2017. They did so after winning their last two games of the season, finishing 5-9. The record earned them seventh place in the league standings.

Offseason
December 6, 2017 - The Cannons announce a "Cannons in Your Community" initiative and will play two regular season home games at Endicott College in Beverly, Massachusetts and one game at Hingham High School in Hingham, Massachusetts.
December 14 - Former MLL player Ben Rubeor is hired as offensive coordinator for the 2018 season.
February 8, 2018 - The Cannons agree to a five-year partnership with Camas Lacrosse of Camas, Washington to field a club lacrosse program. The team, called the Columbia Cannons, will have access to use all of the Cannons' trademarks. The Cannons and Camas Lacrosse will work to host two special events in either Washington or Oregon during the season.
April 18 - With the first pick in the 2018 Collegiate Draft, the Cannons select faceoff specialist Trevor Baptiste from the University of Denver.

Transactions
January 11, 2018 - The Cannons acquire midfielder Ryan Walsh from the New York Lizards in exchange for Matt Landis. The Cannons also receive Scott Firman and the fifth overall pick in the January 2018 Supplemental Draft.
February 14 - The Cannons and Max Seibald agree to a one-year contract through the 2018 season.

Regular season

Transactions
May 30 - Per request, attackman Davey Emala is traded from Boston to the Ohio Machine in exchange for midfielder Mark Cockerton and a seventh round draft pick in the 2019 collegiate draft.
May 31 - Faceoff specialist Joe Nardella is traded from the Cannons to the Atlanta Blaze in exchange for second round draft pick in 2019.

Schedule

Regular season

Standings

References

External links
 Team Website

Major League Lacrosse seasons
Boston Cannons